Wubbzy's Big Movie! is a 2008 American animated comedy anthology film based on the Wow! Wow! Wubbzy! television series. It premiered on the Starz Kids & Family channel on August 29, 2008. The film was produced by Starz Media and Bolder Media in association with Film Roman and distributed by Starz Distribution.

In addition to some new animation, the film uses several previous episodes of Wow! Wow! Wubbzy! that play out as flashbacks.

Plot
Wubbzy, Walden, and Widget are on their way to get some doodleberry pie when Wubbzy trips over a rock and hits his head. He is diagnosed with "knockity-noggin" and is unable to remember who he is, despite Widget and Walden's efforts. The film includes flashbacks to several Wow! Wow! Wubbzy! episodes as Wubbzy attempts to remember his past. At the end of the film, Widget pushes Wubbzy off his chair. he falls down a hill and hits his head again. When Widget and Walden check up on him, he has recovered his memory and remembers his friends. With things back to normal, the trio set off on their original search for doodleberry pie.

Voice cast
 Grey DeLisle as Wubbzy, Buggy, Kooky Kid and Old Lady
 Lara Jill Miller as Widget, Huggy and Old Lady Zamboni
 Tara Strong as Ball Kid #2, Jumping Kid #1, Jumping Kid #2 and Swinging Kid #1
 Carlos Alazraqui as Walden, Earl, Swinging Kid #2, Ball Kid #1, Photographer, Dr. Flooey, Chef Fritz, Moo Moo the Magician, Sweet Tooth Tom, Store Clerk, Announcer and TV Character

Reception
Catherine Dawson March, writing for The Globe and Mail, called the film "a bit of a rip" and commented that Wubbzy's temporary memory loss would be shocking for young Wow! Wow! Wubbzy! viewers. The Dove Foundation reviewed it positively, praising its plot, music, and theme of friendship, and awarding the film its "Dove 'Family-Approved' Seal".

Sequel
A sequel, Wubb Idol, was released direct-to-TV on May 1, 2009. The film features the voice of Beyoncé.

Notes

References

External links

 
 
 

2008 films
2008 animated films
2008 television films
2000s American animated films
American flash animated films
American children's animated comedy films
American children's animated fantasy films
American children's animated musical films
American musical comedy films
Animated films based on animated series
Animated films about bears
Animated films about rabbits and hares
Animated films about friendship
Animated anthology films
Film Roman films
Frederator Studios
2000s children's animated films
2000s English-language films